The 1908 Rollins Tars football team represented Rollins College in the sport of American football as an independent during the 1908 college football season.

Schedule

References

Rollins
Rollins Tars football seasons
College football undefeated seasons
Rollins Tars football